Heerlerheide, in Limburgish Heëlehei or Gen Hei, is a Dutch village located in the commune of Heerlen, in the province of Dutch Limburg. On 1 January 2007, the village had 3180 inhabitants.

Boroughs of Heerlen
Populated places in Limburg (Netherlands)